Nick Foster (born 10 October 1965 in Redditch, Worcestershire) is a British auto racing driver and businessman who has driven in the British Touring Car Championship.

Racing career
After spending the first part of his career in rallying, Foster switched to circuit racing in 2006, competing in the Radical Championship. In 2007 he began two years in the British GT Championship, driving a GT3 class Dodge Viper for Team RPM. Two years in the GT Cup followed.

British Touring Car Championship

In 2011, Foster stepped up to the British Touring Car Championship, driving for West Surrey Racing in a BMW 320si. His best result of the season was a second-place finish in the reversed grid race at Croft, ahead of teammate Rob Collard. He stayed with the team for 2012, now rebranded as eBay Motors. Nick remained with the WSR team for 2013, with a brand new NGTC spec BMW 1 series, alongside Collard and returning former champion Colin Turkington. He stayed as part of WSR's unchanged line–up for the 2014 season. Foster announced his retirement from the BTCC on 7 January 2015.

Foster is Co-Founder and CEO of Novara Technologies a company that connects the world of Medical, Telecommunications and Industrial Electronics with standard and bespoke interconnect and cable solutions.

Personal life
Foster's son, Louis Foster, is a racing driver currently competing in Indy Lights.

Racing record

Complete British GT results
(key) (Races in bold indicate pole position) (Races in italics indicate fastest lap)

Complete British Touring Car Championship results
(key) (Races in bold indicate pole position – 1 point awarded in first race) (Races in italics indicate fastest lap – 1 point awarded all races) (* signifies that driver lead race for at least one lap – 1 point awarded all races)

References

External links
BTCC official site

Living people
English racing drivers
English businesspeople
1965 births
British Touring Car Championship drivers
British GT Championship drivers
Sportspeople from Redditch
Mini Challenge UK drivers
BMW M drivers